Nandi Awards Winners List in the year of 1985

Winners list

References

1985
1985 Indian film awards